Ridinilazole (previously known as SMT19969) is an investigational small molecule antibiotic being evaluated for oral administration to treat Clostridioides difficile infection (CDI). In vitro, it is bactericidal against C. difficile and suppresses bacterial toxin production; the mechanism of action is thought to involve inhibition of cell division. It has properties which are desirable for the treatment of CDI, namely that it is a narrow-spectrum antibiotic which exhibits activity against C. difficile while having little impact on other normal intestinal flora and that it is only minimally absorbed systemically after oral administration. At the time ridinilazole was developed, there were only three antibiotics in use for treating CDI: vancomycin, fidaxomicin, and metronidazole. The recurrence rate of CDI is high, which has spurred research into other treatment options with the aim to reduce the rate of recurrence.

, two phase II trials have been completed and two phase III trials comparing ridinilazole to vancomycin for CDI are expected to be completed in September 2021. Ridinilazole was designated as a Qualified Infectious Disease Product (QIDP) and was granted Fast Track status by the U.S. FDA. Fast Track status is reserved for drugs designed to treat diseases where there is currently a gap in the treatment, or a complete lack thereof. The QIDP designation adds five more years of exclusivity for ridinazole upon approval.

References 

Antibiotics
Benzimidazoles
4-Pyridyl compounds